Evacuation Notice is the fourth solo studio album by American rapper Big Pokey, from Houston, Texas. It was released on July 22, 2008, through Koch Records. It features guest appearances from Big Mike, Lil' Keke, Lil' O, Papa Reu, Paul Wall, Slim Thug and Mobstyle Crew among others. The album peaked at number 75 on the US Billboard Top R&B/Hip-Hop Albums chart.

Critical reception
AllMusic wrote that the album "sees the H-Town heavyweight showing versatility over gutter gangsta tracks, R&B-tinged slow jams, and syrupy slow Texas funk."

Track listing

Charts

References

2008 albums
E1 Music albums
Big Pokey albums
Albums produced by Sam Sneed